Pascal-Joseph Taskin (27 July 1723 – 9 February 1793) was a Belgium-born French harpsichord and piano maker.

Biography
Pascal Taskin, born in Theux near Liège, but worked in Paris for most of his life. Upon his arrival in Paris, he apprenticed in the workshop of François-Étienne Blanchet II. Little else is known of his activity until Blanchet's death on April 27, 1766. In early November of that year, he became a master harpsichord maker in the guild of instrument makers and took over the Blanchet workshop, and by the end of that month, he had married Blanchet's widow. The continuity between the Blanchet and Taskin traditions is indicated by the note Taskin attached to his instruments until 1770:
{|
!PASCAL TASKIN, Facteur de
clavessins du Roi, Élève et
successeur de M. BLANCHET,
demeure même Maison rue de la
Verrerie, vis-à-vis la petite
porte de S. Merry A PARIS
|}
Taskin inherited Blanchet's title of royal harpsichord maker (facteur des clavessins du Roi) and additionally became keeper of the King’s instruments alongside Christophe Chiquelier in 1770, though he only fully occupied that role when Chiquelier retired in 1774. In order to carry out both of his duties as both a maker and keeper of musical instruments, he set up a workshop in Versailles in 1777 and hired his nephew, Pascal-Joseph Taskin II (1750–1829), to work there; his other nephews Henry Taskin and Lambert Taskin also worked for him, though little is known of them. Pascal Joseph II went on to work in the Blanchet workshop in 1763 and, like his uncle, married into the family in 1777 with his wedding to François Etienne Blanchet II's daughter. After his death in 1793, Pascal Taskin was succeeded by his stepson, Armand-François-Nicolas Blanchet, whom he had brought up himself.

Harpsichords and pianos
Pascal Taskin built on and refined the already excellent Blanchet harpsichord-making tradition. He is credited with introducing genouillères (knee-levers) with which to control the stop combinations, and a new register of jacks using peau de buffle (soft buff leather) plectra, instead of the usual quill, in 1768. 

He continued the common French practice, pursued successfully by Blanchet, of making ravalements of Ruckers and Couchet harpsichords, which involved rebuilding the 17th century Flemish instruments, which were highly valued for their sound quality, to suit the modern French tastes. Like other makers of the time, he resorted to selling 'Ruckers' harpsichords which had very few original parts, or none at all, such was the premium associated with the name by then; his last known instrument, a double dated 1788, has a rose signed "Andreas Ruckers" and a Flemish-style painted soundboard. Unlike other makers, his instruments were always of excellent quality, whether passed off as Ruckers or not.

He began to build fortepianos with Blanchet in the 1760s, probably originally modelled after those of Gottfried Silbermann, with a Bartolomeo Cristofori-type action. None of his early pianos survives; the earliest date from the late 1780s and have a very simple action without escapement, which he devised in order to reduce friction. These instruments have luxuriant veneering of the Louis XVI style. Another instrument he made was the Armandine, a large psaltery with gut strings resembling a harpsichord without a keyboard, in 1790 for Anne-Aimée Armand (1774–1846); a surviving example is in the Musée de la Musique, Paris. Taskin's workshop became more occupied with piano production and the importing of English square pianos in the 1770s and 1780s, but not to the detriment of harpsichords; his death inventory of 1793 shows an equal number of each instrument under construction.

There are seven of his double manual harpsichords still in existence; they are prime examples of the late French school of harpsichord building, with a warm and rich tone, range of FF–f''', and disposition of 8' 8' 4' and buff stop. His 1769 double and the 1763/1783–1784 Goermans/Taskin (which Taskin tried to pass off as a Couchet by filing away the initials 'JG' to 'IC') have both been praised as ideal instruments for the late French baroque repertoire such as the works of Rameau and Armand-Louis Couperin. The Yale University Collection of Musical Instruments houses a 1770 double. These instruments have been studied and copied many times by modern makers.

Further reading 
 John Koster: Two Early French Grand Pianos, Early Keyboard Journal, xii (1994)
 William Dowd: The Surviving Instruments of the Blanchet Workshop, The Historical Harpsichord: a Monograph Series in Honor of Frank Hubbard, i, ed. Howard Schott (Stuyvesant, NY, 1984)
 Donald H. Boalch: Makers of the Harpsichord and Clavichord 1440–1840 (Oxford University Press, ASIN: 019318429X; 3rd edition, 1995)
 Frank Hubbard: Three Centuries of Harpsichord Making (Harvard University Press, 1965)
 Andreas Beurmann: Historische Tasteninstrumente: Cembali, Spinette, Virginale, Clavichorde. Die Sammlung Andreas und Heikedine Beurmann im Museum für Kunst und Gewerbe Hamburg (Prestel, Munich/London/New York, 2000)
Colombe Samoyault-Verlet: Les Facteurs de clavecins parisiens : notices biographiques et documents (1550-1793) (Société française de musicologie, Paris, 1966), pp. 69-72.

See also
List of historical harpsichord makers

References 
 Edward Kottick: A History of the Harpsichord (Indiana University Press, 2003)
 William R. Dowd/John Koster: 'Taskin, Pascal (Joseph)', Grove Music Online ed. L. Macy (Accessed 23 May 2007), http://www.grovemusic.com/

External links 
 Double-manual harpsichord, Pascal Taskin. Paris, 1769 — in the Russell Collection, Edinburgh
 Double-manual harpsichord, Jean Goermans/Pascal Taskin. Paris, 1763/1783–1784 — in the Russell Collection, Edinburgh
 PASCAL THE RASCAL!! — information about how Taskin altered the Goermans to make it look like a Couchet

1723 births
1793 deaths
People from Theux
Businesspeople of the Austrian Netherlands
18th-century French people
French musical instrument makers
Harpsichord makers
Piano makers